White Lotus Conglomerate is a group of Indian companies that operate in sectors including real estate, mining, entertainment, sport, agriculture, education, finance and manufacturing. It is headed by businessman Vijay Kumar Naidu, otherwise known as controversial godman and cult leader, Kalki Bhagwan along with his son NKV Krishna and daughter in law Preetha Krishna.

Corporate governance
Vijay Kumar Naidu, often referred to as 'Kalki Bhagwan', runs White Lotus as a family business with his wife Padmavati Devi; his son Krishna Nemam Kurral Vijay Kumar (NKV Krishna), and daughter-in-law Preetha Krishna.

The White Lotus Conglomerate is closely associated with the Oneness Movement, a type of New Religious Movement. The movement's senior administrator is Lokesh Dasaji.

White Lotus has interests in real estate, mining, entertainment, sport, agriculture, education, finance and manufacturing. Senior staff from Vijay Kumar's former Oneness Movement also sit on the boards of these companies. These include Ananda Giri and Jyothirmayee Chundi, also known as Samadarshini. The conglomerate comprises business names including Kosmik/Kosmic, Sacredbanyan, Transend, KPL, Bluewater, Golden Lotus, Goldenage, Chatrachaya, Yogi and Enlite. Many of these businesses exist only as mailing addresses. The CEO of Kosmik Global Media is Uday Sinh Wala.

Writing for Open magazine, senior editor V. Shoba says that there is a succession plan in place, by which NKV Krishna will eventually take over the company. However, she says there has been an ongoing power struggle with his father which has lasted nearly two decades.

Overseas operations 
In the USA, White Lotus Group is based in Omaha, Nebraska, and its CEO is Arun Agarwal. In the Middle East, White Lotus has set up a Dubai-based operation headed by Poosapati Ramachandra Raju Sita and Mahat Mohamoud Noor. White Lotus Capital Investment Holding is a Singapore-based subsidiary of the family's Indian company Global Arkitekts Private Limited.

Meditation and wellness programs 
During the 1990s, Vijay Kumar and his 'Oneness Movement' developed a series of meditation and wellness programs for the Indian market. In around 2014, the Oneness organization launched another series of programs designed to appeal to westerners. In 2017, NKV Krishna and Preetha Krishna merged the Oneness organisation with their own One World Academy to form 'O&O Academy'. These programs were aimed at westerners, and developed with the help of American wellness coach, Tony Robbins. During 2019, NKV Krishna and Preetha Krishna published a book together, called The Four Sacred Secrets, writing under the names 'Krishnaji' and 'Preethaji'.

Real estate development

Pinnacle Tower Project
White Lotus has formed a partnership with Abdinasir Ali Hassan and his Hass Petroleum group to develop The Pinnacle Project in Nairobi. Between them, White Lotus and Hass have invested $200 million in the Pinnacle, which will include the tallest tower in Africa. The development will include a luxury Hilton Hotel with 255 rooms. However, the project has suffered difficulties and is now stalled due to legal action over a land dispute. Construction is being undertaken by China State Construction Engineering Corporation. In September 2020, news aggregator AllAfrica reported that all construction work had ceased.

Hotel Deco XV
The White Lotus Group owns the 1930s Redick Tower building in Omaha, Nebraska. After a $7 million re-development, it was re-opened in 2010 as the Hotel Deco XV.

Oneness Temple
One of its landmark projects is the Oneness Temple, which is located in Varadaiahpalem, Andhra Pradesh, India, on the grounds of Kalki Bhagwan's ashram. It was inaugurated in April 2008, and built at an estimated cost of $75 million.

Other projects
White Lotus is increasing its activities in Wisconsin after the law was changed to enable more tax credits for affordable housing developments. It is one of the developers submitting proposals for the Pershing Center in Lincoln, Nebraska.

Media, communications and sport 
One of the businesses associated with White Lotus, production company Kosmik Global Media, owns the Bengaluru Bulls, a Pro Kabaddi League team. Kosmik Music, is a music label with more than 1,200 titles ranging from Classical, Spiritual, Fusion, New Age, Devotional and Film.  Its most successful brand is "Sacred Chants" that was from traditional vedic hymns. Vijay Kumar and his family owns Studio N, a satellite television channel, which was purchased in 2014 from Narne Srinivas Rao, who is father-in-law of film actor N. T. Rama Rao Jr.

Telecommunications 
During 2019, White Lotus joined with UV Asset Reconstruction (UVARCL) in a consortium which is bidding upwards of $200 Million USD to buy the bankrupt Reliance Communications from tycoon Anil Ambani. Along with UVARCL, other members of the consortium include Mukesh Ambani's Reliance Group, Bharti Airtel and US-based Varde Partners. Directors of UVARCL include Shilpi Sharma, Hari Hara Mishra, US Paliwal, KK Gupta, PP Naolekar, and Dhanraj.

In June 2020, with the approval of the National Company Law Tribunal, UVARCL won bids to buy some of the assets of Reliance Communications. The Tribunal also approved an insolvency resolution plan prepared by UVARCL, with some modifications, to acquire Aircel Ltd, which had been part of a planned merger with Reliance.

Controversies 
Over the years, some activities of the White Lotus Conglomerate and its related companies have received significant press coverage. In India, such publications have included The Hindu, The Times of India and The Deccan Herald newspapers; and The Week magazine. Overseas, its controversies have been covered in media based in Africa, China and the Middle East.

Income tax raids 
In October 2019, over a 5-day period, more than 300 Income Tax department officials and police personnel raided about 40 premises associated with the White Lotus Conglomerate. They confiscated unaccounted assets including cash and gold worth $12 Million USD and cash receipts worth $55 Million USD. The Enforcement Directorate registered a case against Vijay Kumar and NKV Krishna under the Foreign Exchange Management Act.

The Income Tax teams questioned the CEO of one of the ashrams, Lokesh Dasaji, and seized the mobile phones of all people working inside. They also raided the workplace and house of Krishna Dasaji, who founded the Ekam Spiritual Centre in Chennai and Film Nagar in Hyderabad. The investigation is in progress. Among the premises raided were those of the group's charity organisation, One Humanity Care.

Vijay Kumar issued a statement denying that he and his wife had fled the country.

After the raids, The Madras High Court granted time for the Income Tax Department to file its counter affidavit to a writ petition preferred by Preetha Krishna against a ‘look out circular’ issued by the department preventing her from flying abroad without receiving an Income Tax Department clearance certificate. Preetha Krishna's request to travel to the USA and Ukraine was denied by the Income Tax Department assistant director K Mahadevan, who said that her presence would be necessary for the investigation.

In The Week magazine, Lakshmi Subramanian and Rahul Devulapalli suggested that Vijay Kumar's political links to the Telugu Desam Party were a factor in the raids. They also reported that, in 2013, the Income Tax Appellate Tribunal in Chennai had found NKV Krishna guilty of violating tax laws and unlawfully acquiring agricultural land.

Unregulated Hawala transactions 
According to a report in The Hindu newspaper by Mohamed Imranullah S., tax investigators say that large sums of money have been transferred to Dubai through informal, unregulated hawala channels. They allege that the cash is for investing in various overseas projects.

Land disputes in Kenya and India 
In 2019, in Nairobi, a dispute has arisen about the ownership of land where the Pinnacle tower was being built. The dispute centres around ownership of the land, which is being contested by Ugandan tycoon James Mugoya and a trust set up by former United Arab Emirates leader Sheikh Zayed Bin Sultan Al Nahyan. An arrest warrant has been issued for two directors of White Lotus in the Middle East, Poosapati Ramachandra Raju Sita and Mohamud Mahat Noor.

In December 2019, ETB Sivapriyan, writing for The Deccan Herald, says that Vijay Kumar is facing allegations of 'land grabbing'. In December 2019, 907 acres of land owned by Vijay Kumar and his family was 'attached' by Indian Law Enforcement agencies.

During the 1990s, local people organised protests against Vijay Kumar and his organization's ashram for cheaply buying up hundreds of acres of land from local farmers. Subsequently, some of the farmers had their land returned to them.

Stampede and deaths at temple 
In 2008, five people died during a stampede at the inauguration of the Oneness Movement's 'Oneness Temple' at Tada in Andhra Pradesh. At the event, many others were injured, and the temple was closed for a period.

Lawsuit against newspaper 
In 2019, writing for the Times of India, Arun Ram recounts that, in 2002, he wrote an article about Kalki Bhagwan's Oneness Movement which resulted in a multi-million dollar lawsuit against the publication. However, the Mumbai High Court found in favour of the publication, and the media's 'right to write'.

Abandoned charity project 
In 2010, the author Arunda Ardagh wrote that the not-for-profit '100 Village Project' he had referred to in Chapter 10 of his book Awakening into Oneness had been abandoned.

Cult warnings in China 
In 2019, the Chinese Ministry of Public Security and China Anti-Cult Association (CACA) issued a warning about the Oneness Movement in the state run Global Times, prompting popular Taiwanese actress and singer Annie Yi to remove her social media post promoting the movement.

References

External links 
 US website of White Lotus Group
 Website of O&O Academy
 Website of Kalki and Amma Bhagwan

Companies of India
Year of establishment missing